The Jamz is a half-hour workplace sitcom following the exploits of the crew at 101.7 THE JAMZ, Chicago's fictional #1-rated radio station.

The original concept for The Jamz, which was ordered straight-to-series by The Orchard, was created by Jim Kozyra and Chris Petlak, who serve as series regulars, writers, and co-executive producers.

Kozrya and Petlak were working at Chicago's 101.9 FM "The Mix" when they came up with the idea of a sitcom based on life at a radio station.

In 2012, Kozyra and Petlak raised a couple thousand dollars online to create a web series about life at a dysfunctional radio station. Because the eipodes received very little views, the two created a pilot for a full-fledged television series called “The Jamz” and submitted it to the New York Television Festival in 2014.

Episodes for Season 1 were released on iTunes April 12, 2016. The series premiered on Netflix April 30.

The series is shot in Chicago.

Cast
 Chris Petlak as Jay-Jay
 Jim Kozyra as Fitzy
 David Pasquesi as Kasey
 Tamberla Perry as Geena
 Emily Peterson as Chrissy
 Kathy Najimy as Dan
 Vincent Teninty as Wyatt
 Michael Patrick Thornton as Stanton
 Rammel Chan as Intern
 Cedric Young as Suds
 Matt Kozlowski as Clancy
 Sarah Mitchell as Liz
 Amy Rapp as Julie

Episodes

Season 1 (2016)

References

External links
 

Television shows set in Chicago
Television shows set in Cook County, Illinois
Television shows set in the United States
2010s American sitcoms
2016 American television series debuts
2010s American workplace comedy television series
English-language television shows